Elwyn Brooks White (July 11, 1899 – October 1, 1985) was an American writer. He was the author of several highly popular books for children, including Stuart Little (1945), Charlotte's Web (1952), and The Trumpet of the Swan (1970). In a 2012 survey of School Library Journal readers, Charlotte's Web came in first in their poll of the top one hundred children's novels. In addition, he was a writer and contributing editor to The New Yorker magazine, and also a co-author of the English language style guide The Elements of Style.

Life
E.B. White was born in Mount Vernon, New York, the sixth and youngest child of Samuel Tilly White, the president of a piano firm, and Jessie Hart White, the daughter of Scottish-American painter William Hart. Elwyn's older brother Stanley Hart White, known as Stan, a professor of landscape architecture and the inventor of the vertical garden, taught E.B. White to read and to explore the natural world.

While attending Cornell University, White was a private in the Student Army Training Corps (SATC). In early 1918, the War Department created the SATC to hasten the training of soldiers for the war in Europe. Students continued to take college courses while training for the military. Unlike the Reserve Officers' Training Corps (ROTC), SATC students were required to live and take all meals on campus, adhered to a strict military schedule of study and training, and required a pass to go off campus on weekends. The SATC program was disbanded in December 1918, and there is no evidence White served on active military duty or went overseas.

White graduated from Cornell University with a Bachelor of Arts degree in 1921, where he was elected to Phi Beta Kappa. He got the nickname "Andy" at Cornell, where tradition confers that moniker on any male student whose surname is White, after Cornell co-founder Andrew Dickson White. While at Cornell, he worked as editor of The Cornell Daily Sun with classmate Allison Danzig, who later became a sportswriter for The New York Times. White was also a member of the Aleph Samach and Quill and Dagger societies and Phi Gamma Delta ("Fiji") fraternity.

After graduation, White worked for the United Press (now United Press International) and the American Legion News Service in 1921 and 1922. From September 1922 to June 1923, he was a cub reporter for The Seattle Times. On one occasion, when White was stuck writing a story, a Times editor said, "Just say the words." He was fired from the Times and later wrote for the Seattle Post-Intelligencer before a stint in Alaska on a fireboat. He then worked for almost two years with the Frank Seaman advertising agency as a production assistant and copywriter before returning to New York City in 1924. When The New Yorker was founded in 1925, White submitted manuscripts to it. Katharine Angell, the literary editor, recommended to editor-in-chief and founder Harold Ross that White be hired as a staff writer. However, it took months to convince him to come to a meeting at the office and additional weeks to convince him to work on the premises. Eventually, he agreed to work in the office on Thursdays.

White was shy around women, claiming he had "too small a heart, too large a pen." But in 1929, after an affair which led to her divorce, White and Katherine Angell were married. They had a son, Joel White, a naval architect and boat builder, who later owned Brooklin Boat Yard in Brooklin, Maine. Katharine's son from her first marriage, Roger Angell, spent decades as a fiction editor for The New Yorker and was well known as the magazine's baseball writer.

In her foreword to Charlotte's Web, Kate DiCamillo quotes White as saying, "All that I hope to say in books, all that I ever hope to say, is that I love the world." White also loved animals, farms and farming implements, seasons, and weather formats.

James Thurber described White as a quiet man who disliked publicity and who, during his time at The New Yorker, would slip out of his office via the fire escape to a nearby branch of Schrafft's to avoid visitors who he didn't know: 

Later in life, White developed Alzheimer's disease and died on October 1, 1985, at his farm home in North Brooklin, Maine. He is buried in the Brooklin Cemetery beside Katharine, who died in 1977.

Career

E.B. White published his first article in 1925, then joined the staff in 1927 and continued to contribute for almost six decades. Best recognized for his essays and unsigned "Notes and Comment" pieces, he gradually became the magazine's most important contributor. From the beginning to the end of his career at The New Yorker, he frequently provided what the magazine calls "Newsbreaks" (short, witty comments on oddly worded printed items from many sources) under various categories such as "Block That Metaphor." He also was a columnist for Harper's Magazine from 1938 to 1943.

In 1949, White published Here Is New York, a short book based on an article he had been commissioned to write for Holiday. Editor Ted Patrick approached White about writing the essay telling him it would be fun. "Writing is never 'fun'", replied White. That article reflects the writer's appreciation of a city that provides its residents with both "the gift of loneliness and the gift of privacy." It concludes with a dark note touching on the forces that could destroy the city that he loved. This prescient "love letter" to the city was re-published in 1999 on his centennial with an introduction by his stepson, Roger Angell.

In 1959, White edited and updated The Elements of Style. This handbook of grammatical and stylistic guidance for writers of American English was first written and published in 1918 by William Strunk Jr., one of White's professors at Cornell. White's reworking of the book was extremely well received, and later editions followed in 1972, 1979, and 1999. Maira Kalman illustrated an edition in 2005. That same year, a New York composer named Nico Muhly premiered a short opera based on the book. The volume is a standard tool for students and writers and remains required reading in many composition classes. The complete history of The Elements of Style is detailed in Mark Garvey's Stylized: A Slightly Obsessive History of Strunk & White's The Elements of Style.

In 1978, White won a special Pulitzer Prize citing "his letters, essays and the full body of his work". He also received the Presidential Medal of Freedom in 1963 and honorary memberships in a variety of literary societies throughout the United States. The 1973 Oscar-nominated Canadian animated short The Family That Dwelt Apart is narrated by White and is based on his short story of the same name.

Children's books
In the late 1930s, White turned his hand to children's fiction on behalf of a niece, Janice Hart White. His first children's book, Stuart Little, was published in 1945, and Charlotte's Web followed in 1952. Stuart Little initially received a lukewarm welcome from the literary community. However, both books went on to receive high acclaim, and Charlotte's Web won a Newbery Honor from the American Library Association, though it lost out on winning the Newbery Medal to Secret of the Andes by Ann Nolan Clark.

White received the Laura Ingalls Wilder Medal from the U.S. professional children's librarians in 1970. It recognized his "substantial and lasting contributions to children's literature." That year, he was also the U.S. nominee and eventual runner-up for the biennial Hans Christian Andersen Award, as he was again in 1976. Also, in 1970, White's third children's novel was published, The Trumpet of the Swan. In 1973 it won the Sequoyah Award from Oklahoma and the William Allen White Award from Kansas, both selected by students voting for their favorite book of the year. In 2012, the School Library Journal sponsored a survey of readers, which identified Charlotte's Web as the best children's novel ("fictional title for readers 9–12" years old). The librarian who conducted it said, "It is impossible to conduct a poll of this sort and expect [White's novel] to be anywhere but #1."

Awards and honors
1953 Newbery Honor for Charlotte's Web
1960 American Academy of Arts and Letters Gold Medal
1963 Presidential Medal of Freedom
1970 Laura Ingalls Wilder Award
1971 National Medal for Literature 
1977 L. L. Winship/PEN New England Award, Letters of E.B. White
1978 Pulitzer Prize Special Citation for Letters

Other
The E.B. White Read Aloud Award is given by The Association of Booksellers for Children (ABC) to honor books that its membership feel embodies the universal read-aloud standards that E.B. White's works created.

Bibliography

Books
Less than Nothing, or, The Life and Times of Sterling Finny (1927)

Ho Hum: Newsbreaks from the New Yorker (1931). Intro by E.B. White, and much of the text as well.
Alice Through the Cellophane, John Day (1933)
Every Day is Saturday, Harper (1934)
Farewell to Model T (1936, G P Putnam's Sons) - originally published under pseudonym Lee Strout White as Farewell, My Lovely! (1936, The New Yorker) collaboration with Richard L Strout
The Fox of Peapack, and other poems (1938, Harper)
Quo Vadimus: or The Case for the Bicycle, Harper (1938)
A Subtreasury of American Humor (1941). Co-edited with Katherine S. White.
One Man's Meat (1942): A collection of his columns from Harper's Magazine
The Wild Flag: Editorials From The New Yorker On Federal World Government And Other Matters (1943)
Stuart Little (1945)
Here Is New York (1949)
Charlotte's Web (1952)
The Second Tree from the Corner (1954)
The Elements of Style (by William Strunk Jr. in 1918, revised and expanded by White in 1959)
The Points of My Compass (1962) - letters
The Trumpet of the Swan (1970)
Letters of E.B. White (1976)
Essays of E.B. White (1977)
Poems and Sketches of E.B. White (1981)
Writings from The New Yorker 1925-1976 (1990, HarperCollins, ed Rebecca M. Dale)
Farewell to Model T / From Sea to Shining Sea (2003, Little Bookroom)

In the Words of E.B. White (2011)
An E.B. White Reader. Edited by William W. Watt and Robert W. Bradford.

Essays and reporting

References

External links

 "E.B. White, The Art of the Essay No. 1", The Paris Review, Fall 1969 – interview by George Plimpton and Frank H. Crowther
  (audio-video)
 miNYstories based on Here Is New York
 
 
 
 

1899 births
1985 deaths
20th-century American essayists
20th-century American journalists
20th-century American male writers
20th-century American novelists
20th-century American poets
20th-century American short story writers
American children's writers
American humorists
American humorous poets
American letter writers
American male essayists
American male journalists
American male non-fiction writers
American male novelists
American male poets
American male short story writers
American opinion journalists
American people of Scottish descent
American social commentators
Anthologists
American copywriters
Cornell University alumni
Deaths from Alzheimer's disease
Deaths from dementia in Maine
Humor researchers
Laura Ingalls Wilder Medal winners
The New Yorker people
The New Yorker staff writers
Newbery Honor winners
Novelists from Maine
Novelists from New York (state)
People from Brooklin, Maine
Presidential Medal of Freedom recipients
Pulitzer Prize winners
Seattle Post-Intelligencer people
The Seattle Times people
Urban theorists
Writers about activism and social change
Writers from Mount Vernon, New York
Writers of books about writing fiction
Writers of style guides
Hanna-Barbera people
Mount Vernon High School (New York) alumni
Members of the American Academy of Arts and Letters